The  Great Bear River, which drains the Great Bear Lake westward through marshes into the Mackenzie River, forms an important transportation link during its four ice-free months. It originates at south-west bay of the lake. The river has irregular meander pattern  channel with average depth . Historic air photos show no evidence of bank erosion or channel migration in a 50-year period.

The low discharge rate is due to small amount of precipitation in watershed area. Great Bear River contained open reaches that had melted out in place over 80 percent of its length in 1972 and 1974.

The settlement of Tulita is located at the mouth of the river.

Tributaries 
The tributaries of the Great Bear River include; 
 Porcupine River 
 Rosalie Creek 
 Stick Creek 
 Wolverine Creek 
 St. Charles Creek 
 Brackett River

See also
List of rivers of the Northwest Territories

References

External links
Great Bear Lake: Facts, Discussion Forum, and Encyclopedia Article
Canadian Council for Geographic Education page with a series of articles on the history of the Mackenzie River.
Mackenzie River (river, Canada) : The lower course -- Britannica Online Encyclopedia.

Rivers of the Northwest Territories
Physiographic provinces
Physiographic sections
Tributaries of the Mackenzie River